Kim Tae-won (April 12, 1965) is a Korean guitarist with over 30 years of experience in Korean music industry, currently leading one of the most successful rock bands in Korean music history, Boohwal. His life was dramatised in a four episode KBS2 short series Rock, Rock, Rock, where Kim was portrayed by musician-actor No Minwoo.

Adolescence

He was a talented billiards player, having achieved the level of 300 points as a highschool senior. His guitar skill was even more outstanding: He is said to have been able to play proficiently the guitar riff in Led Zeppelin’s “Babe I'm Gonna Leave You” in middle school and the guitar solo of (towards the end of the song) Deep Purple's "Highway Star" at a much faster speed than normal. He slowly rose to fame among fellow students in the Seodaemun area, his home town. He was called “the best guitarist everybody knows”.

Career

At 20, he started a rock band called "The End" with two colleagues, one of whom was Kim Jong-Seo who later left the band to join the then more established rock act Sinawe. With The End, he performed covers of western rock songs for audiences in various places in Korea. It was when Jong-Seo joined that the band changed its name into "Boohwal", which means resurrection in Korean. After Jong-Seo left the band, Lee Seung-Cheol joined as new lead vocalist and they gained huge success with their first hit number, "Heeya (희야)."

Together with Sinawe leader Shin Daechul and Baekdoosan's Kim Do Kyun, Tae-won worked on the guitar musical project D.O.A. and released the album Dead or Alive in 2003.

Personal life

In 2011, Kim was diagnosed with stomach cancer. In one of Qualifications of Men episodes the member had to testing for cancer, but unfortunately Kim's results were positive. Kim Tae Won underwent surgery to remove the tumor on the 16th of January, and underwent another one on the 22nd. All of the tumors have been removed successfully, he is now completely cured.

References

1965 births
South Korean rock guitarists
Living people
People from Seoul
Musicians from Seoul
Singers from Seoul